Roger De Pauw (27 February 1921 – 3 August 2020) was a Belgian cyclist. He competed in the tandem event at the 1948 Summer Olympics. He rode together with Louis Van Schill and finished 5th. In August 2016, he was included in a local exhibition about historical Olympians from Wilrijk.

References

External links
 

1921 births
2020 deaths
Belgian male cyclists
Olympic cyclists of Belgium
Cyclists at the 1948 Summer Olympics
Cyclists from Antwerp